The 1967 Svenska Cupen final took place on 1 November 1967 at Idrottsparken in Norrköping. It was the first final since 1953 and the second consecutive final between Allsvenskan sides Malmö FF and IFK Norrköping. IFK Norrköping played their fifth final in total and Malmö FF played their seventh final in total. Malmö FF won their third consecutive final and their sixth title with a 2–0 victory.

Match details

External links
Svenska Cupen at svenskfotboll.se

Cupen
1967
Malmö FF matches
IFK Norrköping matches
November 1967 sports events in Europe
Sports competitions in Norrköping